A market window is a government-owned or directed institution claiming to operate on a commercial basis, but that benefits from some level of government support.

In trade policy, esp. export promotion activities, market windows like for example Export Development Canada (EDC) or Germany`s KfW (formerly Kreditanstalt für Wiederaufbau) most often provide financing/lending activities that offer flexible terms and conditions that fall outside of the discipline of the Organisation for Economic Co-operation and Development (OECD) Arrangement for Official Export Credit Agencies.

References
 The 2002 National Export Strategy, Trade Promotion Coordinating Committee, Report to the United States Congress, http://www.ita.doc.gov/media/Publications/pdf/nes2002FINAL.pdf

Diplomacy